Hibbertia cunninghamii is a species of flowering plant in the family Dilleniaceae and is endemic to the south-west of Western Australia. It blooms between August and December producing yellow flowers. 

This species was first formally described in 1832 by William Jackson Hooker from an unpublished described by William Aiton. Hooker's description was published in Curtis's Botanical Magazine from specimens "introduced by Mr. Allan Cunningham from King George's Sound". The specific epithet (cunninghamii) honours Allan Cunningham. 

Hibbertia cunninghamii grows on floodplains and in swampy areas in and around granite outcrops in the Avon Wheatbelt, Esperance Plains, Jarrah Forest, Swan Coastal Plain and Warren biogeographic regions of south-western Western Australia.

See also
List of Hibbertia species

References

cunninghamii
Eudicots of Western Australia
Plants described in 1832
Taxa named by William Jackson Hooker